Honest Candidate 2 is a 2022 South Korean comedy film directed by Jang Yu-jeong, starring Ra Mi-ran, Kim Mu-yeol, Yoon Kyung-ho and Park Jin-joo. A sequel of the 2020 film Honest Candidate, it was wrapped up on October 31, 2021 after 3 months filming. Honest Candidate 2 was released on September 28, 2022.

Synopsis
A sequel of 2020  film Honest Candidate, it is a comedy about Joo Sang-sook (Ra Mi-ran), called the 'mouth of truth', who is dreaming of her return to politics after falling out of the Seoul mayor election.

Cast
 Ra Mi-ran as Joo Sang-sook
 Kim Mu-yeol as Park Hee-cheol
 Yoon Kyung-ho as Bong Man-sik
 Seo Hyun-woo as Cho Tae-joo 
 Park Jin-joo as Bong Man-soon
 Yoon Doo-joon as Kang Yeon-joon
 Supporting
 Lee Jin-hee as Lee Yeon-mi, Joo Sang-sook's administrative secretary. 
 Special appearance
 Yoo Jun-sang as President of the Republic of Korea
 Kim Jae-hwa as Rim Seon-hee, Representative of North Korea 
 On Joo-wan as Kim Jun-young, TV news anchor

Production
On February 9, 2021 when Ra Mi-ran won the Best Actress Award for her role in Honest Candidate at the 41st Blue Dragon Film Awards, a sequel was confirmed. At award ceremony she said, "Actually, I'm trying to film Honest Candidate 2. I will try to be your belly button thief next year." On August 6, the casting of Ra Mi-ran, Kim Mu-yeol and Yoon Kyung-ho reprising their roles from Honest Candidate was confirmed. In addition Seo Hyun-woo, Park Jin-joo, and Yoon Doo-joon joined the cast.

The principal photography began on July 31, 2021 and was wrapped up on October 31.

References

External links
 
 
 
 
 

2022 films
2020s Korean-language films
2020s political comedy films
South Korean political comedy films
Next Entertainment World films
Films set in Gangwon Province, South Korea
Films about architecture
Films about corruption